CCSU Baseball FIeld is a baseball venue in New Britain, Connecticut, United States.  It is home to the Central Connecticut Blue Devils baseball team of the NCAA Division I Northeast Conference.  It features an artificial turf surface, an electronic scoreboard, bullpens, batting cages, dugouts, and a covered press box.

The facility, constructed prior to the 2010 season, opened on March 10, 2010.  In the game, Central Connecticut State lost to Hartford 12–11.  During the 2009 season, while the field was under construction, the program played at Beehive Field in New Britain.

Balf–Savin Field
The previous venue, known as Balf–Savin Field, was on the same site.  The new facility retained the name of the old until 2014, when it dropped the previous name.

See also 
 List of NCAA Division I baseball venues

References

External links
 Balf–Savin Field

College baseball venues in the United States
Baseball venues in Connecticut
Central Connecticut Blue Devils baseball
2010 establishments in Connecticut
Sports venues completed in 2010